Hyperectis dioctias is a moth of the family Crambidae. It has only been recorded from the Hawaiian islands of Kauai, Oahu, Maui and Hawaii, but it might be an introduced species in the Hawaiian Islands.

The male has a peculiar "bladder" under the hindwing.

External links

Pyraustinae
Endemic moths of Hawaii
Taxa named by Edward Meyrick